Elections were held in the Regional Municipality of Halton of Ontario on October 25, 2010 in conjunction with municipal elections across the province.

Halton Regional Council

Burlington

Halton Hills

Milton

Oakville

References 

2010 Ontario municipal elections
Regional Municipality of Halton